Jean Obeid (8 May 19398 February 2021) was a Lebanese journalist and politician, who served in different cabinet posts, the last of which was foreign minister of Lebanon from 2003 to 2004.

Early life
Obeid hailed from a Maronite family. He was born in Alma, a village in the Zgharta district, on 8 May 1939.

Career
Obeid was a journalist by profession. He held several high-level positions in various newspapers and magazines. He was an advisor on Arab affairs to two former Lebanese Presidents, Elias Sarkis (1978-1982) and Amin Gemayel (1983-1987). Gemayel also appointed him special envoy to Syria. On 11 February 1987, Obeid met with Parliament Speaker Hussein Husseini and was kidnapped by nine gunmen in west Beirut. Obeid was freed unhurt after four days.

Obeid served as a member of the parliament, representing Chouf from 1991 to 1992 and Tripoli from 1992 to 2005. He served as minister of state in the cabinet led by Prime Minister Rafik Hariri in 1996. Then he was named as the minister of national education, youth and sports. 

On 17 April 2003, he was appointed foreign minister in a reshuffle to the last cabinet of Hariri, replacing Mahmoud Hammoud in the post. Obeid's tenure ended in 2004, and he was succeeded by Mahmoud Hammoud as foreign minister. In 2008, Obeid ran for the presidential elections and was considered to be possible consensus candidate. He was also a candidate for President of Lebanon and participated in the 2014 Lebanese presidential election.

In May 2018, Obeid returned to the Lebanese parliament by winning the Maronite seat for the constituency of Tripoli.

Personal life and death
Obeid was married to Emile Boustany's daughter, Loubna, and had five children Sleiman, Hala, Amal, Jana and Badwi Obeid. He was the maternal uncle of Jihad Azour a former minister of finance and director of the Middle East and Central Asia Department in the International Monetary Fund. 

On the morning of 8 February 2021, the National News Agency (NNA) announced that Obeid had died due to complications from COVID-19 during the COVID-19 pandemic in Lebanon.

References

External links

1939 births
2021 deaths
Candidates for President of Lebanon
Deaths from the COVID-19 pandemic in Lebanon
Foreign ministers of Lebanon
Lebanese journalists
20th-century Lebanese lawyers
Lebanese Maronites
Members of the Parliament of Lebanon
People of the Lebanese Civil War
People from Zgharta District
Azm Movement politicians